The Federation of Trade Unions of Ukraine (known by its Ukrainian acronym, FPU) is an all-Ukrainian voluntary association of trade unions. It is the largest trade union confederation in Ukraine, with more than 4.8 million members. As of 1 August 2019, 44 national trade unions and 27 regional trade unions were affiliated to the FPU.

Organisation and activities 
The Federation of Independent Trade Unions of Ukraine was established after Ukraine became independent on 6 October 1990. The Federation of Independent Trade Unions of Ukraine was a successor of the Ukrainian Republican Council of Trade Unions, a part of the All-Union Central Council of Trade Unions. The declaration creating the FPU was signed by 25 national and 24 regional trade unions.

In November 1992, at its Second (Extraordinary) Congress, the Federation of Independent Trade Unions of Ukraine was renamed the Federation of Trade Unions of Ukraine.

The aim of the FPU is to express and represent the interests and protect the rights of its member organisations, coordinate their collective actions, promote unity in the trade union movement, represent and protect labour and the socio-economic rights and interests of trade union members before state and local authorities, represent the interests of members in their relationship with employers and their organisations, and to represent its members in interactions with other citizens’ associations.

The FPU main tasks are protection of labour, socio-economic rights and interests of trade union members; social protection of trade union members and their families; legal protection of trade union members; strengthening of FPU influence on political life and in the formation of the civil society; improvement of the social contract with other trade unions, employers, and the state; cooperating with other trade unions and their associations; building and maintaining the equality of rights and opportunities for men and women; strengthening the FPU as a democratic trade union; and strengthening and widening FPU international relations.

At the international level, the FPU is affiliated with the International Trade Union Confederation and Pan-European Regional Council.

The Federation of Trade Unions of Ukraine is participating in the United Nations Global Compact, has a consultative status with UN ECOSOC.

In June and July 2011 the Ukrainian Prosecutor General's Office opened 35 criminal cases regarding the illegal appropriation of sanatoriums run by the FPU.

In June 2014 a group of people wearing army fatigues bearing the insignia of Right Sector and Social-National Assembly stormed the FPU Council in Kyiv in an attempt to disrupt the election of a new leadership. It was unclear whether they had any relation to the Right Sector and Social-National Assembly group themselves.

On 29 July 2020, according to Human Rights Watch, Ukraine's draft law would erode workers’ rights to organize and weaken trade unions.

Affiliates

Chairs
1992: Stoyan Alexander Nikolaevich
2005: Yurkin Alexander Valentinovich
2008: Hara Vasyl Heorhiyovych
2011: Kulik Yuriy Mykolayovych
2014: Hryhoriy Osovyi

See also

 Confederation of Free Trade Unions of Ukraine
 National Confederation of the Trade-Union Organizations of Ukraine
 Central Union of Consumer Associations of Ukraine

References
Notes

Sources

External links
Federation of Trade Unions of Ukraine

 
National trade union centers of Ukraine
International Trade Union Confederation
Trade unions established in 1991
1991 establishments in Ukraine
General Confederation of Trade Unions